The Dennis Sabre is a purpose-built fire engine produced by Dennis Specialist Vehicles of Guildford, Surrey, England from 1995 to 2007. It was the last full-size fire appliance produced by the company before its closure in 2007.

Features
Built as a low-cost alternative to the Dennis Rapier with increased equipment load capacity, the Sabre was available in three sizes: Sabre, Sabre ML, Sabre XL, with most of the coachbuilding on these chassis being undertaken by John Dennis Coachbuilders of Guildford, England. Over the Sabre's thirteen year production run it underwent several subtle styling changes, mainly to the grille, and later shared styling similarities with the compact Dennis Dagger. Production ceased in 2007 with the closure of Dennis Specialist Vehicles. 

Like the Rapier, the Sabre is powered by a Cummins C Series turbocharged six-cylinder diesel engine and has an Allison MD five-speed automatic transmission. The Sabre holds  of water and seats six people in a stainless steel tilting cab.

Operators of the Dennis Sabre include fire brigades in the West Midlands and North East England, Nottinghamshire, Hereford and Worcester, the city of Dublin and the Hong Kong Fire Services Department. The Dublin Fire Brigade are unique in ordering the only Sabre turntable ladders on the Sabre HD (Heavy Duty) chassis, while the Sabre HD was also popular with the Singapore Civil Defence Force as a conventional fire engine. Sabres were also sold to fire brigades in the Czech Republic, Slovakia, South Africa and the Netherlands.

Gallery

References

External links
Dennis Sabre online brochure
JDC (John Dennis Coachbuilders) Sabre brochure
 

Firefighting equipment
Sabre
Sabre